The Kaohsiung Fisherman's Wharf (also Fishermen's Wharf) was a wharf in Gushan District, Kaohsiung, Taiwan. Today it is Kaohsiung Port Warehouse No. 2 (KW2), a multi-functional space combining cultural creative industries, exhibitions and dining.

History
The wharf was originally the number 2 port of the port of Kaohsiung. Its previous function was exporting bananas, wood and steel. However, because of the transformation of economy and container automation, the function of the port declined gradually.

The government promotes the tourism industry in these years, so the number 2 port had the chance to become a sightseeing wharf, combining seaside scenery and food. The name of the wharf became a more cultural one as the Kaohsiung Fisherman's Wharf. Nowadays, it has become one of Kaohsiung's scenic spots, following the successful step of Urban Spotlight Arcade and Love River.

The lease of  Kaohsiung Fisherman's Wharf was terminated on October 28, 2011

In 2018,  Kaohsiung Port Warehouse No. 2 (KW2), the former Kaohsiung Fisherman's Wharf, has been reimagined and repurposed to combine cultural creativity, dining, and exhibition spaces within a completely open port area.

Transportation
The wharf is accessible within walking distance south east of Sizihwan Station of Kaohsiung MRT.

See also
 List of tourist attractions in Taiwan

References

External links

 Kaohsiung Fisherman's Wharf 

Year of establishment missing
Buildings and structures in Kaohsiung
Tourist attractions in Kaohsiung
Wharves in Taiwan